was a town located in Kitakatsushika District, Saitama, Japan.

On March 23, 2010, the town of Washimiya, along with the town of Kurihashi (also from Kitakatsushika District), and the town of Shōbu (from Minamisaitama District), was merged into the expanded city of Kuki.

Washimiya was famous for Washinomiya Shrine, one of the oldest shrines in the Kanto Region.

References

Dissolved municipalities of Saitama Prefecture
Populated places disestablished in 2010
2010 disestablishments in Japan